Großer See is a lake in Landkreis Uckermark, Brandenburg, Germany. At an elevation of 93 m, its surface area is 2.6 km². It is situated in Fürstenwerder, part of the municipality of Nordwestuckermark.

Lakes of Brandenburg
Uckermark (district)
LGrosserSee